Mchinji is a district in the Central Region of Malawi. The capital is Mchinji. The area's economy is sustained by rain-fed agriculture.

Demographics
At the time of the 2018 Census of Malawi, the distribution of the population of Mchinji District by ethnic group was as follows:
 89.2% Chewa
 6.2% Ngoni
 2.1% Yao
 1.1% Lomwe
 0.6% Tumbuka
 0.1% Sena
 0.1% Mang'anja
 0.1% Tonga
 0.1% Nkhonde
 0.0% Nyanja
 0.0% Lambya
 0.0% Sukwa
 0.3% Others

Government and administrative divisions

There are six National Assembly constituencies in Mchinji:

 Mchinji - East
 Mchinji - North
 Mchinji - North East
 Mchinji - South
 Mchinji - South West
 Mchinji - West

Since the 2009 election all of these constituencies have been held by members of the Malawi Congress Party.

References

Districts of Malawi
Districts in Central Region, Malawi